Wendy Gazelle is an American actress.

Career 
Gazelle first film role was a minor role in the 1985 film Remo Williams: The Adventure Begins.

Gazelle had a small role in the 1995 movie The Net.

Personal life 
Gazelle married John Ales on 17 March 2001.

Filmography

Movies 

 1985 - Remo Williams: The Adventure Begins
 1987 - Hot Pursuit, Sammy and Rosie Get Laid
 1988 - The In Crowd, The Understudy: Graveyard Shift II
 1989 - Triumph of the Spirit
 1991 - Queens Logic, Crooked Hearts
 1994 - Benders
 1995 - The Net
 1997 - Dead Men Can't Dance

TV Movies 

 1993 - Victim of Love: The Shannon Mohr Story
 1997 - Tell Me No Secrets

Serials 

 1987 - The Cosby Show, Crime Story
 1992 - Brooklyn Bridge
 1995 - The Single Guy
 1996 - Chameleon
 1997 - Visitor, Nothing Sacred, Lawyers
 1999 – Doctors from LA , Get Real , The Smurfs
 2000 - Fugitive
 2001 – Emergency, The X-Files
 2002 – Lawyers , For the People
 2004 – CSI: Las Vegas, House
 2005 - Surgeons
 2006 – Messenger of Lost Souls, Murderous Numbers
 2008 - Boston Legal
 2009 – Private Practice, Eastwick

References

External links 

 
 

20th-century American actresses
21st-century American actresses